Donovan Woods is a Canadian folk and country singer-songwriter. He has released several albums of folk and roots music, including the Juno Award-winning Both Ways.

Early life
Woods was born and raised in Sarnia, Ontario. He began playing guitar and writing songs as a teenager.

Career
Woods' first album, The Hold Up, was released in 2007.

His second album, The Widowmaker, was released in 2010, and his third album, Don't Get Too Grand, was released in 2013 and garnered Woods' first Juno Award nomination for Roots & Traditional Album of the Year: Solo.

His fourth album, Hard Settle, Ain't Troubled, was released February 26, 2016, and was a longlisted nominee for the 2016 Polaris Music Prize. At the 12th Canadian Folk Music Awards, Woods won the award for English Songwriter of the Year, and the album was nominated for Contemporary Album of the Year.

Woods' fifth full-length album Both Ways was released on April 20, 2018. At the Juno Awards of 2019, Both Ways won the Juno Award for Contemporary Roots Album of the Year. In May 2019 Woods released The Other Way, a companion album to Both Ways which featured more acoustic-based renditions of the prior album's songs. The Other Way included guest vocals from Tenille Townes on "I Ain't Ever Loved No One", which was a duet with Rose Cousins in its original Both Ways version.

His newest album, Without People, was released on November 6, 2020. The album featured guest vocals from both Katie Pruitt and Rhys Lewis as well as songwriting credits from Ashley Monroe, Tucker Beathard, Thomas Finchum and Ed Robertson of Barenaked Ladies. As part of the release, Woods launched the Donovan Woods With People Project, which featured dancers and visual artists from multiple countries creating pieces inspired by songs from the album. One of the project's featured artists was Brooklyn-based singer-songwriter, Ariana and the Rose.

On May 7, 2021 Woods released the song "IOWA" with Aoife O'Donovan. On March 18, 2022, Woods released his EP, Big Hurt Boy. He subsequently opened for Matt Nathanson on his "Some Mad Hope 15th Anniversary Tour" in the United States.

In 2023, he participated in an all-star recording of Serena Ryder's single "What I Wouldn't Do", which was released as a charity single to benefit Kids Help Phone's Feel Out Loud campaign for youth mental health.

Songwriting

Woods' song "Portland, Maine" (co-written with Abe Stoklasa) has also been recorded by Tim McGraw. Woods' song "Leaving Nashville" (also co-written with Abe Stoklasa) has been recorded by Lady A singer Charles Kelley.

Woods was signed to Warner/Chappell Nashville in 2016.

In 2018, Woods was a SOCAN Songwriting Prize nominee as cowriter of James Barker Band's song "Chills". He has also co-written the number one Canada Country hits "Feels Like That" by the Reklaws and "Forever's Gotta Start Somewhere" by Chad Brownlee.

Film/TV Syncs 
Woods' song "Brand New Gun" was featured in the movie Numb starring Matthew Perry. His song "Wait and See" was featured on Degrassi: The Next Generation, and his song "My Cousin Has a Grey Cup Ring" was used in commercials for the Grey Cup. "Grey Cup Ring" was inspired by Woods' father, who is a cousin of former Montreal Alouettes player Glen Weir. His song "Kennedy" was featured on an episode of The Good Doctor in 2017,  "Don't Get Too Grand" was featured on Rookie Blue and "Portland, Maine" was featured on season 1 of Legacies in 2019. Woods' has had other placements in shows like Felicity, Less Than Kind and The Fosters.

Woods wrote "The Heart of Christmas" performed by Alicia Witt in the Hallmark movie, Our Christmas Love Song.

Discography

Awards and nominations

References

External links
 
Donovan Woods (official site)

1980 births
People from Sarnia
Musicians from Ontario
Living people
Canadian folk singer-songwriters
Canadian male singer-songwriters
Canadian folk rock musicians
Canadian Folk Music Award winners
21st-century Canadian male singers
Juno Award for Contemporary Roots Album of the Year winners
Canadian folk-pop singers